Robin Amelia Arzón is an American ultramarathon runner and author of the book Shut Up and Run. She is also the VP of Fitness Programming and an Instructor at Peloton.

Early life and education 

Robin Arzón was born in Philadelphia to a Cuban refugee mother and a Puerto Rican father. Her mother is a doctor who taught herself English by watching PBS. Her father is an attorney and former law professor.

As a child, she was encouraged to focus on education and family. Athletics were never part of her life growing up.

Arzón attended New York University, where she graduated magna cum laude. Afterwards, she went on to attend Villanova University School of Law.

Career

Law career 
Arzón graduated from Villanova University School of Law in 2007 and spent seven years as a corporate litigator at Paul, Hastings, Janofsky & Walker, LLP. She was inspired and encouraged by her father, also an attorney, to pursue a career in law.

Beginning of fitness journey 
In the summer of 2002, while an undergrad, Arzón was taken hostage with 40 others in a wine bar in Manhattan's East Village. "A man, armed with three pistols and a samurai sword, shot three people, doused the group with kerosene and threatened them with a barbecue lighter. He grabbed Arzon by the hair and held the gun and lighter to her head while using her as a human shield to communicate with police. Two patrons eventually tackled the man, giving police the opportunity to enter the bar and subdue him."

This trauma inspired Arzon to begin running for the first time in her life. A year later, in 2003, she saw a flyer for a 10K race at a bank on a Friday afternoon and spontaneously decided to join the run the following morning. This 10K would be Arzon's very first race and first athletic endeavor of her life. She said of the whim, "I had no idea how far the 10km distance was in miles." After the race, she began running 2-3 miles at a time in between her law school classes.

Over the course of the next decade, while pursuing law, she fell in love with running, health, and fitness and began to prepare for a career change.

Arzon has since run over 50 races, including 25 marathons, three 50-mile ultramarathons, and one 100-mile race. She ran her first marathon, the New York Marathon, in 2010. She once ran five marathons in five days for MS Run the US in honor of her mother, documented in the documentary Run It Out. She completed her first 100-mile race at the Keys100 - a race that begins in Key Largo and ends in Key West, Florida - in less than 30 hours in 2016.

Transition to health and fitness career 
In 2012, Arzon began a career in health and fitness after leaving her job at the law firm. She began this time as a freelance sports reporter, writing for publications like Newsweek and New York Magazine. She did sports reporting from the London Olympics in 2012.

Arzon wanted to be closer to the athletics and wanted to show others that there is an alternative way to be an athlete. She reached out  to John Foley, CEO of Peloton, and in 2014 she joined Peloton in New York City as an instructor. In 2016, she was promoted to Vice President of Fitness and Programming of Peloton.

In 2013, Arzon co-founded the fitness movement Undo Ordinary and the print publication Undo magazine in 2013.

She was one of 20 elite Americans to trek the Serengeti in National Geographic Channel's, MYGRATIONS, in 2015. The series, which aired in 2016, showed 20 people trekking the journey of the annual wildebeest migration that happens every spring from the Serengeti Plains to Maasai Mara in Kenya. The cast members, who were formed of survivalists and athletes, were given no maps or weapons and carried only food and water.

Arzon is a global Adidas ambassador. She starred in their Here to Create campaign commercial in 2016.

She is also a Road Runners Club of America-certified running coach.

Personal life 

She was diagnosed as a Type 1 Diabetic in 2014 and is currently on the Leadership Council of Beyond Type One, a nonprofit organization focused on raising awareness about Type 1 Diabetes founded by Nick Jonas.

In 2019, Arzon married investment manager Drew Butler in Tulum, Mexico. She and Butler met at a speakeasy bar in Manhattan’s East Village in 2016. Their four-day, immersive wedding experience was inspired by their mutual love of Burning Man. 

Arzon and Butler announced the birth of their first child, a daughter named Athena Amelia Arzón-Butler, on March 2, 2021. Arzon is a vegan.

Bibliography 
 Shut Up and Run: How to Get Up, Lace Up, and Sweat with Swagger (June 2016) 
Strong Mama (January 2022)

References

External links 
 

1981 births
Living people
Peloton instructors